The article provides table of standings of Women's 400 metres individual medley final and Women's 400 metres individual medley heats.

Final

The Women's 400 metres individual medley final was held at the Melbourne Sports and Aquatic Centre on the 21 March 2006 at 19:38 AEST.

Heats
The Women's 400 metres individual medley heats were held at the Melbourne Sports and Aquatic Centre on the 21 March 2006 at 10:38 AEST.

Heat 1

Heat 2

References

External links
 Official Website - Aquatics Schedule
 Women's 400m Individual Medley Heats - Heat 01 - Result
 Women's 400m Individual Medley Heats - Heat 02 - Result
 Women's 400m Individual Medley Final - Result

400 metres individual medley
2006 in women's swimming